Witt Township (T9N R2W) is located in Montgomery County, Illinois, United States. As of the 2010 census, its population was 1,163 and it contained 585 housing units.

Geography

Demographics

Adjacent townships
 Nokomis Township (north)
 Audubon Township (northeast)
 North Hurricane Township, Fayette County (southeast)
 Fillmore Township (south)
 East Fork Township (southwest)
 Irving Township (west)
 Rountree Township (northwest)

References

External links
City-data.com
Illinois State Archives
Historical Society of Montgomery County

Townships in Montgomery County, Illinois
Townships in Illinois